Barasat Government College (BGC) is a state Government-owned college in Barasat, North 24 Parganas in the Indian state of West Bengal. The college was established in 1950 and is affiliated with the West Bengal State University and run by the Government of West Bengal. It was formerly affiliated with the University of Calcutta. It is a NAAC accredited with "A" grade & DST-FST sponsored college.

The college has two "shifts"- Morning and Day. Morning section accommodates the Undergraduate general courses in Arts and Science, and the Day section is for Honours Undergraduates as well as Postgraduates in Botany (which was established in 2003), Zoology, Physics, Chemistry, Bengali.

Departments

Under Graduation

Arts
 Bengali
 English
 History
 Political Science
 Philosophy
 Sanskrit

Science

 Mathematics
 Physics
 Chemistry
 Botany
 Zoology
 Geography
 Economics

Post Graduation

Science
 Physics
 Chemistry
 Botany 
 Zoology

Arts
 Bengali

Accreditation
The college is recognised by NAAC and UGC. The college is awarded A grade by NAAC.

See also
Education in India
List of colleges in West Bengal
Education in West Bengal

References

External links

Universities and colleges in North 24 Parganas district
Colleges affiliated to West Bengal State University
Barasat
Educational institutions established in 1950
1950 establishments in West Bengal